Saiswaroopa Iyer is an Indian author, who has published in the mythological genre. Her notable books are Abhaya, Avishi, Draupadi and Mauri.

She has an MBA from the Indian Institute of Technology, Kharagpur and is a former investment professional.

She has been using Kindle Direct Publishing for publishing her books.

Abhaya 

Abhaya is Saiswaroopa's first book, and also the first book of the Abhaya collection. The story is about Abhaya, a fictional princess and Dharmasena, her father, Bhauma, lord of Kamarupa and Krishna. The character Abhaya is portrayed as a formidable warrior who defeats the Bhauma.

Avishi 
Avishi had been optioned for film or digital adaptation.

Draupadi

References

Year of birth missing (living people)
21st-century Indian women writers
21st-century Indian novelists
IIT Kharagpur alumni
Living people